Natica acinonyx is a species of predatory sea snail, a marine gastropod mollusk in the family Naticidae, the moon snails.

Description
The length of the shell attains 15.6 mm.

Distribution
This species occurs in the Atlantic Ocean off Angola and Senegal.

References

 Torigoe K. & Inaba A. (2011). Revision on the classification of Recent Naticidae. Bulletin of the Nishinomiya Shell Museum. 7: 133 + 15 pp., 4 pls

External links
 Marche-Marchad I. (1957). Description de cinq Gastropodes marins nouveaux de la côte occidentale d'Afrique. Bulletin du Muséum National d'Histoire Naturelle, Paris (2) 29 (2): 200-205

Endemic fauna of Angola
Naticidae
Gastropods described in 1957